Do Gol Sar (also known as Do Kal Sarā) is a village in Owshiyan Rural District, Chaboksar District, Rudsar County, Gilan Province, Iran. At the 2006 census, its population was 95, in 26 families.

References 

Populated places in Rudsar County